Nebria kirgisica is a species of ground beetle in the Nebriinae subfamily that is endemic to Kyrgyzstan.

References

kirgisica
Beetles described in 1982
Beetles of Asia
Endemic fauna of Kyrgyzstan